Decorative folding is an artistic type of folding similar to origami but applied to fabrics instead of paper. Some types of objects that can be folded are napkins, towels, and handkerchiefs.

Folding can be done as a hobby or an art but is most commonly encountered as a decoration in luxury hotels (towels) or fancy restaurants (napkins). Napkin folding has a centuries-old history   and dates back to the times of Louis XIV of France.

As opposed to paper origami, folding fabrics generally requires less precision; "molding" is introduced as part of the artistic process adding an element similar to modeling in clay.

See also
Furoshiki
List of decorative knots
Hotel toilet paper folding
Towel animal

Notes and references

Further reading

 

Origami
Textile arts